Arborio is an Italian surname. Notable people with the surname include:

 Count Carlo Emanuele Arborio Mella
 Edoardo Arborio Mella (1808-1884)
 Ferdinando Arborio Gattinara di Breme (1807-1869)
 Mercurino Arborio, marchese di Gattinara (1465 - 1530, an Italian statesman and jurist

Italian-language surnames